Giolla Ernain Ó Martain, Irish poet and Chief Ollam of Ireland, died 1218.

Overview

The most detailed reference to Ó Martain occurs in the Annals of Loch Cé, which gives his obituary under the year 1218: "Gill Aernáin .H. Martain, ollamh Erenn, & sói il-dánachta, iar cinnedh a bhetha ag na manchaibh, in pace quieuit."/"Gilla-Ernain O'Martain, chief poet of Erinn, and professor of many arts, after spending his life with the monks, in pace quievit."

The Annals of Ulster, sub anno 1217, state "Gilla Arnain h-Ua Martain, ollum Erenn i m-breitheamhnacht, mortuus est"/"Gilla-Arnain Ua Martain, ollam of Ireland in jurisprudence, died."

A family of the name were of the Soghain people, and natives of the kingdom of Ui Maine.

External links
 http://www.ucc.ie/celt/published/T100010A/index.html

Medieval Irish poets
People from County Roscommon
People from County Galway
12th-century Irish writers
13th-century Irish writers
13th-century Irish poets
Irish male poets
Irish-language writers
1218 deaths